The 2009 NCAA Division I softball tournament was held from May 15 through June 3, 2009 as part of the 2009 NCAA Division I softball season. The 64 NCAA Division I college softball teams were selected out of an eligible 284 teams on May 10, 2009. 30 teams were awarded an automatic bid as champions of their conference, and 34 teams were selected at-large by the NCAA Division I Softball Selection Committee. The tournament culminated with eight teams playing in the 2009 Women's College World Series at ASA Hall of Fame Stadium in Oklahoma City, Oklahoma.

National seeds
Teams in italics advanced to the Super Regionals.
Teams in bold have advanced to the Women's College World Series.

Florida

Washington

Regionals and Super Regionals

Gainesville Super Regional

Stanford Super Regional

Ann Arbor Super Regional

Tuscaloosa Super Regional

Atlanta Super Regional

Athens Super Regional

Tempe Super Regional

Los Angeles Super Regional

Automatic bids

Women's College World Series

Participants

† Excludes results of the pre-NCAA Women's College World Series of 1969 through 1981.

Tournament notes
Alabama advanced to the Women's College World Series after sophomore pitcher Kelsi Dunne, threw back-to-back no-hitters in the Tuscaloosa Super Regional, an NCAA record.
The SEC advanced three teams to the Women's College World Series for the first time in conference history; it was also the first time a conference outside the Pac-10 had done it.

Bracket and Results

Game results

Championship game

Final standings

All-Tournament Team
The 2009 Women's College World Series All-Tournament team:
Kelley Montalvo, Alabama
Charlotte Morgan, Alabama
Brittany Rogers, Alabama
Alisa Goler, Georgia
Taylor Schlopy, Georgia
Megan Bush, Florida
Stacey Nelson, Florida
Ashley Charters, Washington
Kimi Pohlman, Washington
Morgan Stuart, Washington
Niki Williams, Washington
Danielle Lawrie, Washington (Most Outstanding Player)

Breakdown by school:
Washington: 5
Alabama: 3
Florida: 2
Georgia: 2

WCWS records tied or broken

In Game 8, Alabama broke the record for largest margin of victory in an NCAA-era WCWS game by defeating Arizona 14-0. The record was previously set by Arizona's 12-0 victory over Fresno State in the 1989 WCWS.
In Game 9, Georgia broke the NCAA-era home run record in a single WCWS game with four: two from Taylor Schlopy, one from Brianna Hesson, and one from Ashley Pauly.  Schlopy became only the fourth player in NCAA-era WCWS history to hit two home runs in one game.
In game 11, Washington's Niki Williams broke the NCAA-era WCWS single-game RBI record with seven RBIs, including a fifth inning grand slam.

Post-Series Notes
Despite having 3 teams advance to the semifinals, the SEC failed to win its first ever WCWS, and Washington continued the West Coast's dominance in college softball. As of 2009, only two teams east of the Mississippi River have won the WCWS (Michigan in 2005 and Michigan State in 1976, the latter in the pre-NCAA era).

See also 
NCAA Division I Softball Championship

References

External links
Official NCAA bracket
Official NCAA Softball web site

NCAA Division I softball tournament
Tournament